Charles Lund Black Jr. (September 22, 1915 – May 5, 2001) was an American scholar of constitutional law, which he taught as professor of law from 1947 to 1999. He is best known for his role in the historic Brown v. Board of Education Supreme Court case, as well as for his Impeachment: A Handbook, which served for many Americans as a trustworthy analysis of the law of impeachment during the Watergate scandal.

Early life and career
Born in Austin, Texas, Black graduated from the University of Texas at Austin in 1935 and later obtained a master's degree in English.  He received his LL.B. from Yale Law School in 1943, then served in the Army Air Forces as a teacher and as an associate at Davis, Polk, Wardwell, Sunderland & Kiendl. In 1947, he became a professor of law at the Columbia University Law School, where he wrote legal briefs for the successful 1954 Brown v. Board of Education suit.  He also was involved in civil rights cases in the south.

In 1956, he joined Yale Law School as its first Henry R. Luce Professor of Jurisprudence. He was appointed Sterling Professor of Law in 1975. During his thirty-one-year career at Yale, he wrote numerous books, including The People and the Court, Structure and Relationship in Constitutional Law, and Impeachment: A Handbook. Black, along with Grant Gilmore, co-authored The Law of Admiralty, an influential text on maritime law. Black's students at Yale included Hillary Clinton.

An outspoken critic of the death penalty, Black also authored Capital Punishment: The Inevitability of Caprice and Mistake. Black was critical of what he called the United States' "special relationship" with Israel and stated in 1989 that he had "for a long time been outraged by Israel’s cruelly implemented disdain of Palestinian human rights, and on that account have long opposed American aid to Israel".

Black was elected a Fellow of the American Academy of Arts and Sciences in 1976. He returned to Columbia Law School in 1986, when his wife Barbara Aronstein Black became dean there. He served as adjunct professor of law until 1999. Upon his passing, Akhil Amar called Black "his hero" and said that Black "had the moral courage to go against his race, his class, his social circle".

Personal life
Black began writing poetry at the age of 40, publishing three volumes, Telescopes and Islands, Owls Bay in Babylon and The Waking Passenger. While a freshman at University of Texas, Black attended a performance by Louis Armstrong at the Driskill Hotel in Austin, an event that he claimed inspired his interest in race and civil rights. Black, who held an annual "Armstrong Evening" at Yale until the musician's death in 1971, was featured in the 2001 Ken Burns miniseries, Jazz.

Selected works
1957 – The Law of Admiralty, by Grant Gilmore and Charles Black
1958 – Old and New Ways in Judicial Review
1960 – The People and the Court: Judicial Review in a Democracy
1963 – Perspectives in Constitutional Law
1963 – Telescopes & Islands. Poems
1970 – The Unfinished Business of the Warren Court 
1974 – Capital Punishment: The Inevitability of Caprice and Mistake 
1974 – Impeachment: A Handbook
1981 – Decision According to Law 
1985 – Structure and Relationship in Constitutional Law 
1986 – The Humane Imagination 
1997 – A New Birth of Freedom: Human Rights, Named and Unnamed

References

External links
Elegy for a heroic lawyer
Charles Black and Human Rights

1915 births
2001 deaths
American legal writers
American legal scholars
United States Army Air Forces personnel of World War II
Columbia University faculty
Fellows of the American Academy of Arts and Sciences
Writers from Austin, Texas
Scholars of constitutional law
United States Army Air Forces soldiers
University of Texas at Austin alumni
Yale Law School alumni
Yale Law School faculty
Yale Sterling Professors
Fellows of Queens' College, Cambridge
Davis Polk & Wardwell lawyers